Waite Park is a city in Stearns County, Minnesota, United States. The population was 8,341 at the 2020 census. It is part of the St. Cloud Metropolitan Statistical Area.

History
Waite Park was incorporated in 1893. The city was named for Henry Chester Waite, a state legislator. A post office was established at Waite Park in 1897, and remained in operation until 1972.

Geography

Minnesota State Highway 23 and County 75 are two of Waite Park's main routes.

Minnesota Highway 15 skirts Waite Park's southeastern border. Interstate Highway 94 is immediately southwest of Waite Park.

Waite Park is immediately west of the city of St. Cloud.

Demographics

2020 census

Note: the US Census treats Hispanic/Latino as an ethnic category. This table excludes Latinos from the racial categories and assigns them to a separate category. Hispanics/Latinos can be of any race.

2010 census
As of the census of 2010, there were 6,715 people, 3,127 households, and 1,538 families living in the city. The racial makeup of the city was 83.6% White, 6.6% African American, 0.7% Native American, 3.6% Asian, 2.7% from other races, and 2.9% from two or more races. Hispanic or Latino of any race were 4.5% of the population.

There were 3,127 households, of which 22.7% had children under the age of 18 living with them, 32.9% were married couples living together, 10.9% had a female householder with no husband present, 5.4% had a male householder with no wife present, and 50.8% were non-families. 38.0% of all households were made up of individuals, and 14.6% had someone living alone who was 65 years of age or older. The average household size was 2.12 and the average family size was 2.83.

The median age in the city was 32.6 years. 19.8% of residents were under the age of 18; 16.3% were between the ages of 18 and 24; 26.6% were from 25 to 44; 20.1% were from 45 to 64; and 17.4% were 65 years of age or older. The gender makeup of the city was 47.6% male and 52.4% female.

2000 census
As of the census of 2000, there were 6,568 people, 2,967 households, and 1,536 families living in the city. The racial makeup of the city was 92.74% White, 0.72% African American, 0.56% Native American, 3.50% Asian, 0.05% Pacific Islander, 1.20% from other races, and 1.23% from two or more races. Hispanic or Latino of any race were 2.01% of the population.

There were 2,967 households, out of which 23.8% had children under the age of 18 living with them, 36.5% were married couples living together, 10.1% had a female householder with no husband present, and 48.2% were non-families. 32.1% of all households were made up of individuals, and 10.4% had someone living alone who was 65 years of age or older.  The average household size was 2.19 and the average family size was 2.80.

In the city, the population was spread out, with 19.6% under the age of 18, 21.2% from 18 to 24, 30.1% from 25 to 44, 16.0% from 45 to 64, and 13.1% who were 65 years of age or older.  The median age was 29 years. For every 100 females, there were 94.9 males.  For every 100 females age 18 and over, there were 93.0 males.

The median income for a household in the city was $33,803, and the median income for a family was $43,415. Males had a median income of $27,066 versus $21,481 for females. The per capita income for the city was $17,796.  About 7.9% of families and 12.1% of the population were below the poverty line, including 20.8% of those under age 18 and 4.7% of those age 65 or over.

Government
In the 2020 presidential election, President Joe Biden and Vice President Kamala Harris won a 3% majority of Waite Park votes, compared to 2016 when former president Donald Trump won with a 13% margin of victory.

Education
Waite Park is in the St. Cloud Area School District.

Most residents are zoned to Discovery Elementary School, while some blocks north of 3rd Street are zoned to Westwood Elementary School. The zoned middle school is North Middle School, and the zoned high school is Apollo High School.

Waite Park is home to the St. Cloud area campus of Globe University/Minnesota School of Business, a private career college.

References

External links
 City Website

Cities in Stearns County, Minnesota
Cities in Minnesota
St. Cloud, Minnesota metropolitan area